Daniel Herskedal (born 2 April 1982) is a Norwegian jazz  tubist. He is regarded as one of the most talented jazz tubists in Norway.

Career 
Herskedal started playing the French horn as a boy, then later took up the tuba. He started formal studies at the Storyville jazz club and attended the music program at Molde videregående skole. He recorded albums with his hometown band, Dixi, before moving to Trondheim. He got his bachelor's degree in jazz at Trondheim Musikkonsevatorium (2002–06), where he started the trio Listen!  with Espen Berg (piano) and Bendik Giske (saxophone). In 2008, he earned a master's degree in jazz tuba at the Rhythmic Music Conservatory in Copenhagen. His thesis was on joik and jazz, in addition to preparing the orchestral work A Sacred Narrative, which was performed in Kong Haakon Kirke, the Norwegian Seamen's Church in Copenhagen (2007). During his studies he joined the Trondheim Jazz Orchestra on several occasions, and in Copenhagen he played in the student orchestra stoRMChaser with Django Bates. He has also worked as a county musician in Nord-Trøndelag.

Herskedal plays in several bands, such as City Stories, Listen, including Bendik Giske (saxophone) and Espen Berg piano (established in 2002), Magic Pocket, Trondheim Jazz Orchestra, and Jens Carelius. In the trio Kaktusch he plays with Anton Eger (drums) and Marius Neset (saxophone). In Quintus Big Band (established in 2007) he collaborated with Bendik Giske (saxophone), Kristoffer Lo (tuba), Ingrid Bergene Fosaa (horn), Morten Schrøder and Bjørn Erik Heggli (trumpet), Frode Fjellheim and Stian Lundberg (percussion), and Elisabeth Fossan (trombone). The quartet Bat Band includes Hayden Powell (trumpet), Steinar Nickelsen (organ) and Lasse Ehn (drums). With Stefan Ringive (trombone) and Anders Bast (saxophone) and Lasse Ehn (drums), he performs in the quartet BrassBoost. With Hayden Powell (trumpet), Erik Johannessen (trombone) and Erik Nylander (drums) he formed the quartet Magic Pocket that appeared at Nattjazz and Moldejazz (2004). He wrote music for the short film The End (2008) by Bendik Kaltenborn.

Awards and honors 
 2004: The Jury's soloist award at the Getxco international jazz competition
 2004: The Jury's first prize, with Listen, at the Hoeillart international jazz contest
 2008: JazzTalent Award at Moldejazz
 2009: Jazztipendiat of the Year, with Magic Pocket, at Moldejazz

Discography

Solo albums 
 2010: City Stories (NorCD)
 2013: Dagane (NorCD)
 2015: Slow Eastbound Train (Edition Records)
 2017: The Roc (Edition Records)
 2019: Voyage (Edition Records)
 2020: Call for Winter (Edition Records)
 2022: Out of the Fog (Edition Records)

Collaborations 
With the trio Listen
 2007: Listen! (Schmell)
 2009: II (Schmell)

With the trio Lochs/Balthaus/Herskedal
 2009: Lochs/Balthaus/Herskedal (Music Under Construction)
 2012: Choices (Berthold)

With Magic Pocket & Morten Qvenild
 2011: The Katabatic Wind (Bolage)

With Marius Neset
 2012: Neck of the Woods (Edition), with Svanholm Singers

References

External links 

20th-century Norwegian tubists
21st-century Norwegian tubists
Avant-garde jazz musicians
Norwegian jazz tubists
Norwegian jazz composers
Norwegian University of Science and Technology alumni
1982 births
Living people
Musicians from Molde
Magic Pocket members
Edition Records artists
NorCD artists